is a former Japanese football player.

Playing career
Chiba was born in Sendai on July 24, 1977. After graduating from high school, he joined Japan Football League club Brummel Sendai (later Vegalta Sendai) based in his local in 1996. He became a regular player from 1997 and played many matches as defensive midfielder for the club for a long time. The club was promoted to new league J2 League from 1999. In 2001, the club won the 2nd place and was promoted to J1 League from 2002. However the club gained new member Hajime Moriyasu and Silvinho in 2002 and Toshiya Ishii in 2003. So, Chiba's opportunity to play decreased behind new member from 2002 and the club was relegated to J2 from 2004. From 2004, he became a regular player again. In 2009, the club won the champions and was promoted to J1 from 2010 for the first time in 7 years. He retired end of 2010 season.

Club statistics

References

External links

1977 births
Living people
Association football people from Miyagi Prefecture
Japanese footballers
J1 League players
J2 League players
Japan Football League (1992–1998) players
Vegalta Sendai players
Association football midfielders